Timothy or Tim Jones may refer to:

Sports
 Tim Jones (American football) (born 1998), American football wide receiver
 Tim Jones (infielder) (born 1962), baseball infielder
 Tim Jones (pitcher) (born 1954), American baseball pitcher
 Tim Jones (sledge hockey) (born 1987), American sledge hockey player
 Tim Jones (swimmer) (born 1967), British swimmer
 Timothy Jones (cricketer) (born 1978), former English cricketer
 Timothy Jones (cyclist) (born 1975), Zimbabwe cyclist
 Timothy Booth Jones (born 1952), former English cricketer

Politics
 Tim Jones (politician) (born 1971), Republican member of the Missouri House of Representatives
 Tim Jones (Canadian politician)

Other
 Tim Jones (Search and Rescue) (1956–2014), Canadian media spokesperson for North Shore Rescue in Vancouver
 Tim Jones (writer) (born 1959), New Zealand poet and author
 Tim Jones (film composer) (born 1971), American composer and musician
 Timothy Jones Jr., (born 1981), murdered his five children in Lexington County, South Carolina

See also
Timothy Clement-Jones, Baron Clement-Jones (born 1949), Liberal Democrat peer and spokesman for Culture, Media and Sport